Habuapur is a village in Gosainganj block of Lucknow district, Uttar Pradesh, India. In 2011, its population was 1041 in 249 households. It is administrated by gram panchayat.

References 

Villages in Lucknow district